Mission: Impossible – Music from the Original Motion Picture Score is the original score album by Danny Elfman for the 1996 film Mission: Impossible. The score was originally planned to be composed by Alan Silvestri, but he was replaced during the post-production by Elfman. The score also includes Lalo Schifrin's original "Theme from Mission: Impossible".

Style 
While the soundtrack was generally praised for its versatility it was received very diversely as an example of the new directions chosen by the composer.

Track listing

Personnel
Danny Elfman
Graeme Revell
Lalo Schiffrin

References
 

Danny Elfman soundtracks
1996 soundtrack albums
1990s film soundtrack albums
Mission: Impossible music
Mission: Impossible (film series)